Elisha "Little" Chism (July 1, 1916 – April 4, 1982)  was an American baseball outfielder in the Negro leagues. He played with the Cleveland Buckeyes in 1946 and the Birmingham Black Barons in 1947. His brother, John, played in the Negro leagues in 1937, and his statistics are combined with Eli's in some sources.

References

External links
 and Baseball-Reference Black Baseball stats and Seamheads

Birmingham Black Barons players
Cleveland Buckeyes players
1916 births
1982 deaths
Baseball players from Arkansas
Baseball outfielders
20th-century African-American sportspeople